Kaada Closing Statements is a solo album by Norwegian pop/experimental  Kaada, released on May 25, 2018 on Mirakel Recordings.  Closing Statements is a concept album based on mortality.  “The titles are quotes and fragments from different farewell utterances... things that people said when they were about to die,” he noted in the album press release.

Track listing

References

External links
 Official website

Kaada albums
2018 albums